Network Data Representation (NDR) is an implementation of the presentation layer in the OSI model. It is used for DCE/RPC and Microsoft RPC (MSRPC).

See also
 DCE/RPC
 Microsoft RPC

External links
NDR Specification

Internet Standards
Internet protocols
Presentation layer protocols